Hampton Lovett is a village and civil parish in the Wychavon district of the county of Worcestershire, England. It is just north of Droitwich.

The church of St. Mary and All Saints is noted for its Norman features. English Heritage lists the church as a Grade I listed building.

People 
People from Hampton Lovett include:

 Sir John Pakington (died 1551), an MP and High Sheriff.

Burials 
Burials at Hampton Lovett include:

 Oswald Partington, 2nd Baron Doverdale

References 

Villages in Worcestershire